Tyrone Poole (born February 3, 1972) is a former American professional football player who played 13 seasons as a cornerback in the National Football League (NFL). He was drafted by the Carolina Panthers 22nd overall of the 1995 NFL Draft. He played college football at Fort Valley State.

Poole has also played for Indianapolis Colts, Denver Broncos, New England Patriots, Oakland Raiders and Tennessee Titans. He earned Super Bowl rings with the Patriots in Super Bowl XXXVIII and Super Bowl XXXIX.

Early years
Poole graduated from LaGrange High School, where he lettered in both football and track.

College career
Poole was as a four-year starter at Fort Valley State University and became the first player from that school to ever be selected in the first round of the NFL draft. His career numbers included 41 starts in 42 games with 17 interceptions (262 yards) and 70 punt returns for 934 yards (13.3 avg). Poole also set the school record for the 200-meter dash and finished second in the national finals.

He majored in business.

Professional career

Carolina Panthers
Poole was selected by the Carolina Panthers in the first round (22nd overall) of the 1995 NFL Draft out of Fort Valley State University. He was the second draft choice in Panthers history behind Kerry Collins. He spent three years anchoring the Panthers' secondary.

Indianapolis Colts
Poole was traded to the Indianapolis Colts in 1998 in exchange for a second-round selection in the 1999 NFL draft. He played three years for the Colts, starting almost every game.

First stint with Broncos
Poole signed with the Denver Broncos as a free agent before the 2001 season, however, he spent the entire 2001 NFL season on the reserve squad. He returned to full-time play for the 2002 season.

New England Patriots
Poole signed with the New England Patriots before the 2003 NFL season.  Poole was a starting cornerback for the Patriots defense that led them to a 14-2 record and a victory in Super Bowl XXXVIII over the Carolina Panthers.

Poole started the 2004 season again as a starting cornerback, but injured his knee in a Week 6 matchup with Seattle. Poole returned briefly for a few snaps near the end of a Week 14 game against Cincinnati, but was shut down after this and did not play again for the rest of the season. Still, the Patriots went on to win Super Bowl XXXIX, giving Poole his second Super Bowl ring, even though Poole did not play in the game due to his knee injury.

For the 2005 season, Poole once again began the season as a starting cornerback. However, after playing against Oakland in Week 1, he injured his ankle and would not play again all season. The Patriots were eliminated in the divisional round and Poole parted ways with New England.

Oakland Raiders
Poole signed with the Oakland Raiders in the 2006 offseason where he saw action as a reserve player.  He was released after the 2006 season.

Houston Texans
Poole was signed by the Houston Texans during the 2007 preseason. However, he was released by the team during final cuts.

Second stint with Broncos
Poole signed with the Denver Broncos on August 13, 2008, but was released on August 30.

Tennessee Titans
Poole was signed by the Tennessee Titans on November 22, 2008 after cornerbacks Reynaldo Hill and Eric King were placed on injured reserve.

References

External links

1972 births
Living people
American football cornerbacks
American Ninja Warrior contestants
Fort Valley State Wildcats football players
Carolina Panthers players
Indianapolis Colts players
Denver Broncos players
New England Patriots players
Oakland Raiders players
Tennessee Titans players
People from LaGrange, Georgia
Players of American football from Georgia (U.S. state)